Lachnocnema luna, or Druce's large woolly legs, is a butterfly in the family Lycaenidae. The species was first described by Hamilton Herbert Druce in 1910. It is found in Ghana (the Volta Region), eastern Nigeria, Cameroon, Gabon, the Republic of the Congo, the north-eastern part of the Democratic Republic of the Congo, Uganda and north-western Tanzania. The habitat consists of forests.

Larvae have been recorded on Cassia alata. They fed on the secretions of immature ant-attended membracids and jassids.

References

External links

Die Gross-Schmetterlinge der Erde 13: Die Afrikanischen Tagfalter. Plate XIII 65 h

Butterflies described in 1910
Miletinae